Valentí Marín i Llovet (17 January 1872 in Barcelona – 7 December 1936 in ididem) was a Catalan notary, chess writer and player.

He was in the Spanish team in the 1st unofficial Chess Olympiad of Paris, in 1st Chess Olympiad of London, in the 2nd Chess Olympiad of The Hague, in the 3rd Chess Olympiad of Hamburg and in the 4th Chess Olympiad in Prague; and he was president of the Federación Española de Ajedrez (Chess Spanish Federation, FEDA).

Works
 Un artista en ajedrez (Valentín Marín), 1913, bilingual edition in (Spanish / Esperanto)

External links 
 Chessgames.com ::

1872 births
1936 deaths
Writers from Catalonia
Spanish notaries
Spanish chess writers
Spanish chess players
People from Barcelona